Górczyn may refer to the following places in Poland:
Górczyn, part of the Grunwald district of Poznań
Górczyn, Puck County in Pomeranian Voivodeship
Górczyn, West Pomeranian Voivodeship

See also
Gorczyn